Titanium isopropoxide, also commonly referred to as titanium tetraisopropoxide or TTIP, is a chemical compound with the formula . This alkoxide of titanium(IV) is used in organic synthesis and materials science. It is a diamagnetic tetrahedral molecule. Titanium isopropoxide is a component of the Sharpless epoxidation, a method for the synthesis of chiral epoxides.
 
The structures of the titanium alkoxides are often complex. Crystalline titanium methoxide is tetrameric with the molecular formula . Alkoxides derived from bulkier alcohols such as isopropyl alcohol aggregate less. Titanium isopropoxide is mainly a monomer in nonpolar solvents.

Preparation
It is prepared by treating titanium tetrachloride with isopropanol. Hydrogen chloride is formed as a coproduct:
TiCl4 + 4 (CH3)2CHOH →  Ti{OCH(CH3)2}4 + 4 HCl

Properties
Titanium isopropoxide reacts with water to deposit titanium dioxide:
Ti{OCH(CH3)2}4 + 2 H2O → TiO2 + 4 (CH3)2CHOH
This reaction is employed in the sol-gel synthesis of TiO2-based materials in the form of powders or thin films. Typically water is added in excess to a solution of the alkoxide in an alcohol.  The composition, crystallinity and morphology of the inorganic product are determined by the presence of additives (e.g. acetic acid), the amount of water (hydrolysis ratio), and reaction conditions.

The compound is also used as a catalyst in the preparation of certain cyclopropanes in the Kulinkovich reaction. Prochiral thioethers are oxidized enantioselectively using a catalyst derived from Ti(O-i-Pr)4.

Naming
Titanium(IV) isopropoxide is a widely used item of commerce and has acquired many names in addition to those listed in the table. A sampling of the names include:
titanium(IV) i-propoxide, isopropyl titanate, tetraisopropyl titanate, tetraisopropyl orthotitanate, titanium tetraisopropylate, orthotitanic acid tetraisopropyl ester, Isopropyl titanate(IV), titanic acid tetraisopropyl ester, isopropyltitanate, titanium(IV) isopropoxide, titanium tetraisopropoxide, iso-propyl titanate, titanium tetraisopropanolate, tetraisopropoxytitanium(IV), tetraisopropanolatotitanium, tetrakis(isopropoxy) titanium, tetrakis(isopropanolato) titanium, titanic acid isopropyl ester, titanic acid tetraisopropyl ester, titanium isopropoxide, titanium isopropylate, tetrakis(1-methylethoxy)titanium.

Applications 
TTIP can be used as a precursor for ambient conditions vapour phase deposition such as infiltration into polymer thin films.

References

External links

Alkoxides
Titanium(IV) compounds
Isopropyl compounds